Lublin Old Town is one of the most significant Polish complexes of historic buildings. The Crown Tribunal and the 14th-century Kraków Gate leading from the Old Town to the city center are commonly considered symbols of the city.

The district is one of Poland's official national Historic Monuments (Pomnik historii), as designated May 16, 2007, and tracked by the National Heritage Board of Poland.

Interesting sites and building 
The Krakowska Gate is an entry gate to the old town with remains of defensive fortifications from the 14th century. The gate is built in a gothic style and has some baroque elements added in the 18th century.

See also 
The Lublin Renaissance

Old Town